Javier Chacón Quesada (born 29 July 1985) is a Spanish former professional road bicycle racer.

Born in Vélez-Rubio, Chacón has competed as a fully-fledged professional since the start of the 2012 season, riding as a member of the  team. In his first Grand Tour event, the 2012 Vuelta a España, Chacón featured in the breakaway during two of the first four road stages; the second of which came on the fifth stage, where he initiated a solo breakaway lasting for almost  of the  stage.

Major results

2006
1st  National Under-23 Time Trial Championships
1st Overall Vuelta a Segovia
1st Stage 1
1st Stage 2 (TTT) Vuelta a Palencia
2008
1st Circuito Deputación de Pontevedra
3rd National Amateur Time Trial Championships
9th Overall Volta da Ascension
2009
1st Trofeo Guerrita
2010
1st Stage 10 Vuelta a Venezuela
5th Overall Tour de Serbie
2011
1st Stage 4 Vuelta Ciclista Internacional a Extremadura
4th GP Loinaz Beasain
2012
4th Overall Azerbaijan International Cycling Tour
1st Stage 5

References

External links
Andalucía profile

Cycling Quotient profile

Spanish male cyclists
1985 births
Living people
Cyclists from Andalusia
Sportspeople from the Province of Almería